Cassel is a census-designated place (CDP) in Shasta County, California. Its population is 207 as of the 2020 census, remaining the same from the 2010 census. The ZIP Code is 96016. The community is inside area code 530.

Geography
According to the United States Census Bureau, the CDP covers an area of 2.1 square miles (5.4 km2), 96.44% of it land and 3.56% of it water.

Climate
This region experiences hot and dry summers, with highs over 90 °F in July and August.  According to the Köppen Climate Classification system, Cassel has a warm-summer Mediterranean climate, abbreviated "Csb" on climate maps.

Demographics

The 2010 United States Census reported that Cassel had a population of 207. The racial makeup of Cassel was 194 (93.7%) White, 0 (0.0%) African American, 3 (1.4%) Native American, 0 (0.0%) Asian, 0 (0.0%) Pacific Islander, 4 (1.9%) from other races, and 6 (2.9%) from two or more races. Hispanic or Latino of any race were 6 persons (2.9%).

The Census reported that 207 people (100% of the population) lived in households, 0 (0%) lived in non-institutionalized group quarters, and 0 (0%) were institutionalized.

There were 93 households, out of which 17 (18.3%) had children under the age of 18 living in them, 65 (69.9%) were opposite-sex married couples living together, 2 (2.2%) had a female householder with no husband present, 3 (3.2%) had a male householder with no wife present.  There were 2 (2.2%) unmarried opposite-sex partnerships, and 2 (2.2%) same-sex married couples or partnerships. 18 households (19.4%) were made up of individuals, and 9 (9.7%) had someone living alone who was 65 years of age or older. The average household size was 2.23.  There were 70 families (75.3% of all households); the average family size was 2.54.

The population was spread out, with 32 people (15.5%) under the age of 18, 7 people (3.4%) aged 18 to 24, 29 people (14.0%) aged 25 to 44, 78 people (37.7%) aged 45 to 64, and 61 people (29.5%) who were 65 years of age or older.  The median age was 57.7 years. For every 100 females, there were 105.0 males.  For every 100 females age 18 and over, there were 94.4 males.

The homeowner vacancy rate was 5.7%; the rental vacancy rate was 20.0%.  173 people (83.6% of the population) lived in owner-occupied housing units and 34 people (16.4%) lived in rental housing units.

Politics

Points of Interest
The Pacific Crest National Scenic Trail passes East of Cassel.

Just north of the town is the site of Packway Materials who have repurposed broken construction equipment into sculpture.

References

Census-designated places in Shasta County, California
Census-designated places in California